Merico or Americo-Liberian (or the informal colloquial name "American") is an English-based creole language spoken until recently in Liberia by Americo-Liberians, descendants of original settlers, freed slaves, and African Americans who emigrated from the United States between 1821 and the 1870s. It is distinguished from Liberian Kreyol and from Kru, and may be connected to Gullah and Jamaican Creole.

The original settlers numbered 19,000 in 1860. By 1975 the language was partly decreolized, restricted to informal settings.

Grammatical features

Plurals are unmarked, as in  "rock", "rocks", or marked with a  suffix, as in  "rocks". Verbs are not inflected for past tense.

Separate particles are used to indicate some verb tenses:
  for negation ( "I didn't ask the child"),
  for future ( "we will come"),

The pronouns include:
 Subject: /, //, /, /
 Possessive: /, /, /, /,

See also

 Krio language

References

Americo-Liberian people
English-based pidgins and creoles of Africa
Languages of Liberia
Languages attested from the 19th century